Anna Cecilia Rindeskog (born 4 April 1967 in Härnösand) is a Swedish curler.

She competed at the 1992 Winter Olympics when curling was a demonstration sport.

In 1989 she was inducted into the Swedish Curling Hall of Fame.

Teams

Women's

Mixed

References

External links

Living people
1967 births
People from Härnösand
Swedish female curlers
European curling champions
Swedish curling champions
Curlers at the 1992 Winter Olympics
Olympic curlers of Sweden
Sportspeople from Västernorrland County